Protoneura is a genus of damselfly in the family Protoneuridae. It contains the following species:
Protoneura ailsa 
Protoneura amatoria 
Protoneura aurantiaca 
Protoneura calverti 
Protoneura capillaris  - Black-fronted Threadtail
Protoneura cara  - Orange-striped Threadtail
Protoneura corculum 
Protoneura cupida 
Protoneura dunklei 
Protoneura klugi 
Protoneura macintyrei 
Protoneura paucinervis 
Protoneura peramans 
Protoneura rojiza 
Protoneura romanae 
Protoneura sanguinipes  - Red-legged Threadtail
Protoneura scintilla 
Protoneura sulfurata  - Sulphury Threadtail
Protoneura tenuis  - Scarlet-backed Threadtail
Protoneura viridis 
Protoneura woytkowskii

References

Protoneuridae
Taxonomy articles created by Polbot